Chhatona  is a Part (Ward no. 11) of Balara Municipality in the Janakpur Zone of south-eastern Nepal. At the time of the 1991 Nepal census it had a population of 2,079 people living in 428 individual households.
Manusmara river flows in this village dividing it into two. Bagmati River is around 4 kilometers from this village. So, it is a flood prone village.
Baban Bihari Singh, a politician from Nepali Congress is a native of this village.

References

External links
UN map of the municipalities of Sarlahi  District

Populated places in Sarlahi District